Duncan McRae (born 27 September 1974) is an Australian former rugby league and rugby union footballer. In union he played at fly-half or full-back.

Background
McRae was born in Sydney, New South Wales, Australia.

Early life and career
McRae attended Sydney Boys High School in the early 1990s along with Chris Whitaker & Steven Bell. He was former Puerto Rican Schoolboy international. In the 1990s McRae spent six seasons in the NRL with South Sydney, playing 23 first-grade games between 1993 and 1995 and Canterbury where he played 11 first grade games between 1997–99 and also led the Bulldogs reserve grade side to the 1998 premiership. In 1996, he played a season with the London Broncos in the Super League.

New South Wales Waratahs
In 1999, McRae switched codes playing three seasons with the New South Wales Waratahs. In 2000 McRae joined Saracens, before returning to the Waratahs and Randwick in 2001. In October 2003 McRae joined Gloucester.

Disciplinary problems
In 2001, during the match between the New South Wales Waratahs and the British and Irish Lions, McRae was sent off for punching Irish fly-half Ronan O'Gara eleven times in the head as O'Gara lay grounded. He received a seven-week ban for the assault.

Retirement
McRae retired in 2006, after sustaining a severe neck injury. In a game in the 2005/06 English domestic season against Saracens McRae entered a ruck and crushed vertebrae at the top of his spinal column. He played a few more games but retired shortly after, returning to Australia.

References

External links
Bulldogs profile of Duncan McRae

1974 births
Living people
Australian rugby union players
Rugby union fly-halves
Rugby union fullbacks
Saracens F.C. players
Gloucester Rugby players
Australian rugby league players
Canterbury-Bankstown Bulldogs players
South Sydney Rabbitohs players
London Broncos players
Rugby league halfbacks
Rugby league hookers
Rugby league fullbacks
Rugby league players from Sydney